The St. Antony Church is a historic Roman Catholic Church located in Naravi, Belthangady Taluk. This church has century old history. Fr. Faustine Corti who was from Switzerland came to Naravi and served here from 1905 to 1926. This parish comes under Belthangady Varado which is a part of Roman Catholic Diocese of Mangalore.

History
This church has more than 100 years of long history. Around 1870 a small chapel was built in Naravi. Fr. Faustine Corti from Switzerland was then working at St. Aloysius College, Mangalore as professor came to Naravi in the year 1905 to serve the mission work. By looking at the situation and lifestyle of local Koraga people, Fr. Faustine Corti started the missionary work at Naravi and worked at the betterment of local people. He served the mission work here in Naravi from 1905 to 1926. Being a zealous priest though of a great caliber worked strenuously at naravi for 21 years. On 4 October 1911 then the bishop of Mangalore Diocese Rev. Fr. Paolo Carlo Perini visited Naravi and surprised to see the improvements in the area and with great happiness, he appreciated  Fr. Faustine Corti for his efforts. Not only this, because of tremendous efforts of Fr. Faustine Corti for the betterment of Koraga people, the state civil department awarded him with Kaisar-i-Hind Medal.

In 1913, another missionary Rev. Fr. Gaviragi appointed as assistant to Fr. Corti. But within few days Fr. Gaviragi moved to Aladangady for the mission work. Due to the increased number of people visiting Fr. Corti for consultation, then small office was converted into a big house. In 1918, another mission Rev. Fr. Jiyaro was sent as an assistant to Fr. Faustine Corti to help him in his missionary work. Due to the increased number of Christians, Fr. Faustine Corti decided to build a church because the small chapel was not enough to  cater the needs of local people. In 1923, with the efforts of Rev. Fr. Jiyaro, the foundation work for a new church was started. But because of some inconvenience, the construction work was postponed to 1929. Without regarding his health Fr. Faustine Corti worked for the improvements of the localities for 21 years and died on 9 October 1926.

After the death of Fr. Faustine Corti, Fr. Jiyaro continued the construction work. 10 years later in 1928 Fr. Jiyaro was transferred to Calcutta. In 1929 Fr. Gaviragi who was working as missionary at Aladangady and Badyar came to continue the construction work of Naravi church and even after great difficulty he finished the work in next one year. On 7 May 1930 then Vicar General V. R. Fernandes blessed the church. After this old chapel was converted into school.

Demographics 
The parish has 255 families with a population of 1350 members as of November 2015.

Administration
The educational institutions at Naravi are a platform for many of students for their future life. Among then few are below.
St. Paul's Primary Kannada Medium School
St. Paul's English Medium School
Naravi High School
St. Antony PU College
St. Antony College of Commerce
St. Antony Hostel
St. Paul Orphanage
St. Gerosa Convent

Apart from this, the Catholics of this church have started many associations to help the society.
Catholic Sabha
Women's Association
ICYM(Indian Catholic Youth Movement)
YCS (Young Christian Students)
Altar Children Sodality
Choir Group
Small Christian Community
Marian Sodality
Legion of Mary
St Vincent de Paul Society
Secular Franciscan Order
Catechism Association
Eucharistic Ministry
St. Monica Sodality
Holy Childhood

See also
Roman Catholicism in Mangalore
Goan Catholics
Deanery of Belthangady
Most Holy Redeemer Church, Belthangady
Church Higher Primary School, Belthangady
Church Of Sacred Heart Of Jesus, Madanthyar
Monsignor Ambrose Madtha
Christianity in Karnataka
Diocese of Belthangady
St. Antony Church, Ujire
Syro-Malankara Catholic Eparchy of Puttur

References

External links

Churches in Mangalore Diocese
Religious organizations established in 1885
1885 establishments in India